This is a summary of 1982 in music in the United Kingdom, including the official charts from that year.

Events
20 January – Ozzy Osbourne bites the head off a bat thrown at him during a performance, mistaking it for a toy.
26 April – Rod Stewart is mugged in Los Angeles, California. Stewart loses his $50,000 Porsche to the mugger, but was not hurt.
15 May – "A Little Peace" becomes the 500th UK No. 1 single.
26 May – The Rolling Stones open their European tour in Aberdeen, Scotland.
28 August – Eric Burdon is arrested for cocaine possession after a show at the Rockpalast in Cologne.
22 September – The Who begin their only formally announced "farewell" tour in Washington, D.C.
5 November – First broadcast of The Tube on Channel 4.

Charts

Number-one singles 

"The Model"/"Computer Love" was the first single by a German artist to top the chart since its establishment 29 years earlier. By the end of 1982, there had been two further number ones by German artists, "Seven Tears" and "A Little Peace".

Number-one albums

Year-end charts
The tables below include sales between 1 January and 31 December 1982: the year-end charts reproduced in the issue of Music Week dated 26 December 1982 and played on Radio 1 on 2 January 1983 only include sales figures up until 11 December 1982.

Best-selling singles

Best-selling albums

Notes:

Classical music

New works
Peter Maxwell Davies – Image, Reflection, Shadow
Alun Hoddinott – Quodlibet on Welsh Nursery Tunes for orchestra
Michael Tippett – The Mask of Time (oratorio)

Opera
Gavin Bryars – Medea

Film and Incidental music
Michael Nyman – The Draughtsman's Contract directed by Peter Greenaway.

Musical theatre
Anthony Burgess – Blooms of Dublin
Geoffrey Burgon – Orpheus

Music awards

BRIT Awards
The 1982 BRIT Awards winners were:

Best British producer: Martin Rushent
Best classical recording: Gustav Mahler's – "Symphony No. 10"
Best selling album: Adam and the Ants – "Kings of the Wild Frontier"
British breakthrough act: The Human League
British female solo artist: Randy Crawford
British group: The Police
British male solo artist: Cliff Richard
Outstanding contribution: John Lennon

Births
11 January – Ashley Taylor Dawson, singer (allSTARS*)
16 January – Preston, singer
10 March – Jonathan Ansell, tenor (G4)
6 March - Sinead Shepard, Irish singer (Six)
11 March - Kyle Anderson, Northern Irish singer (Six)
23 March - Emma O'Driscoll, Irish singer (Six) and TV presenter
7 April - Kelli Young, singer (Liberty X)
26 April – Jon Lee, singer (S Club 7)
30 April - Cleo Higgins, singer (Cleopatra)
7 June – Amy Nuttall, actress and opera singer
18 June - Haydon Eshun, singer (Ultimate Kaos)
20 June – Example, singer-songwriter, musician and rapper
30 June
Andy Knowles, musician (Franz Ferdinand)
Ashley Walters, rapper and actor
17 July – Natasha Hamilton, singer (Atomic Kitten)
22 September – Billie Piper, singer and actress
4 October – YolanDa Brown, jazz saxophonist
14 December – Anthony Way, chorister

Deaths
12 January – Hervey Alan, operatic bass and voice teacher, 71
30 January – Stanley Holloway, actor, singer and monologist, 91
4 February – Alex Harvey, rock singer and entertainer, 46 (heart attack)
1 May – William Primrose, violist, 77
12 May – Humphrey Searle, composer, 66
24 May – Richard Hall, composer, 78
16 June – James Honeyman-Scott, guitarist of The Pretenders, 25 (heart failure caused by cocaine intolerance)
25 June – Alex Welsh, jazz musician, 52
29 June – Pipe Major Donald MacLeod, bagpipe musician and composer, 65
29 September – A. L. Lloyd, folk song collector, 74
6 October – Philip Green, film and TV composer and conductor (born 1911)
16 October – Rory McEwen, artist and musician (born 1932)
29 October – William Lloyd Webber, organist and composer, 68
13 November – Chesney Allen, entertainer, 88
16 November – Arthur Askey, entertainer, 82
5 December – Caryl Brahms, musician and writer, 80
date unknown – Bob Roberts, folk singer, 74/75

See also
 1982 in British radio
 1982 in British television
 1982 in the United Kingdom
 List of British films of 1982

References

External links
BBC Radio 1's Chart Show
The Official Charts Company

 
British music
British music by year